In enzymology, a 2-dehydro-3-deoxygluconokinase is an enzyme that catalyzes the chemical reaction

ATP + 2-dehydro-3-deoxy-D-gluconate  ADP + 6-phospho-2-dehydro-3-deoxy-D-gluconate

Thus, the two substrates of this enzyme are ATP and 2-dehydro-3-deoxy-D-gluconate, whereas its two products are ADP and 6-phospho-2-dehydro-3-deoxy-D-gluconate.

This enzyme belongs to the family of transferases, specifically those transferring phosphorus-containing groups (phosphotransferases) with an alcohol group as acceptor.  The systematic name of this enzyme class is ATP:2-dehydro-3-deoxy-D-gluconate 6-phosphotransferase. Other names in common use include 2-keto-3-deoxygluconokinase, 2-keto-3-deoxy-D-gluconic acid kinase, 2-keto-3-deoxygluconokinase (phosphorylating), 2-keto-3-deoxygluconate kinase, and ketodeoxygluconokinase.  This enzyme participates in pentose phosphate pathway and pentose and glucuronate interconversions.

Structural studies

As of late 2007, only one structure has been solved for this class of enzymes, with the PDB accession code .

References 

EC 2.7.1
Enzymes of known structure